Addyme ferrorubella is a species of snout moth. It is found in Australia.

References

Moths described in 1864
Phycitini
Moths of Australia